The 1985 Hockey East Men's Ice Hockey Tournament was the 1st Tournament in the history of the conference. It was played between March 8 and March 16, 1985. Quarterfinal games were played at home team campus sites, while the final four games were, for the first time, played at the Providence Civic Center in Providence, Rhode Island. By winning the tournament, Providence received the Hockey East's automatic bid to the 1985 NCAA Division I Men's Ice Hockey Tournament.

Format
The tournament featured three rounds of play. In the quarterfinals, the second seed and seventh seed, the third seed and sixth seeds, and the fourth seed and fifth seeds played a two-game series where an additional mini-game was played if the teams remained tied to determine the winner and advanced to the semifinals. In the semifinals, the first seed was matched against the lowest remaining quarterfinalist while the other remaining quarterfinalists met in a single-elimination game with the winners advancing to the championship game and the losers meeting in a third-place game. The tournament champion receives an automatic bid to the 1985 NCAA Division I Men's Ice Hockey Tournament.

Conference standings
Note: GP = Games played; W = Wins; L = Losses; T = Ties; PTS = Points; GF = Goals For; GA = Goals Against

Bracket

Teams are reseeded after the quarterfinals

Note: * denotes overtime period(s)

Quarterfinals

(2) Boston University vs. (7) Maine

(3) Providence vs. (6) Northeastern

(4) New Hampshire vs. (5) Lowell

Semifinals

(1) Boston College vs. (5) Lowell

(2) Boston University vs. (3) Providence

Consolation

(2) Boston University vs. (5) Lowell

Championship

(1) Boston College vs. (3) Providence

Tournament awards

All-Tournament Team
F Doug Brown (Boston College)
F Clark Donatelli (Boston University)
F Jon Morris (Lowell)
D Dominic Campedelli (Boston College)
D Peter Taglianetti (Providence)
G Chris Terreri* (Providence)
* Tournament MVP(s)

References

External links
Hockey East Online

Hockey East Men's Ice Hockey Tournament
HE tournament